Acute esophageal necrosis (AEN), black esophagus, or Gurvits syndrome is a rare esophageal disorder. AEN defines itself with dark pigmentation of the esophagus, found during an upper gastrointestinal endoscopy. Pigmentation is usually black friable mucosa. The disorder is extremely rare, as only 89 patients over a span of 40 years have received this diagnosis. Specific study of the disorder's mortality rate is mentioned at 31.8%, but new research suggests mortality rates vary from 30–50%. The exact triggering mechanism for this disorder is still unknown, but is likely multifactorial.

Signs and symptoms
AEN has never been recorded as a one symptom disorder, but instead present by multiple symptoms. The symptoms vary from the severity of the disorder. The most classic sign of AEN is the dark pigmentation of esophageal mucosa in an upper endoscopy, usually viewed as an ulcer or as an infectious disease. Necrosis can be found mostly between the three distals of the esophagus, but stops abruptly at the gastroesophageal junction. The basic and most common symptoms reported are blood in stool and blood in vomiting. Upper gastrointestinal bleeding then is reported, and is very commonly represented in elderly patients. Black or bloody stools and hematemesis account for over three quarters of the case presentations.  Abdominal pain, nausea, vomiting, and unstable vital signs are common.  A cardiovascular event (such as a heart attack) was reported in ten percent of the total known cases.

Risk factors

Modifiable
Having cancer (current or previous) is currently one of the most prevalent out of all conditions among patients. High blood pressure, Chronic lung conditions, Alcohol use disorder, excessive alcohol use combined with other recreational drug use (e.g. cocaine), Kidney failure, and malnutrition are other major risk factors.

Nonmodifiable
Advanced age (average patient aged 57 years old)
Male sex (4 to 1 male dominance)
Cirrhosis
HIV/AIDS
Herpes virus
Atrial fibrilation
Diabetes (currently the most prevalent out of all conditions in patients)

Lesser or unknown of effect
Aortic dissection
Anti-cardiolipin antibodies
CMV infection
Herpetic infection
Hyperglycemia
Hypersensitivity to broad-spectrum antibiotics
Hypothermia
Ischemia
Gastric volvulus
Posterior mediastinal haematoma
Septic shock
Steven Johnson syndrome

Diagnosis
Acute esophageal necrosis can only be diagnosed by an upper gastrointestinal endoscopy.

Treatment
Currently, there is no direct treatment for AEN. Only treatment is for the underlying main diseases or conditions. Appropriate hydration is set. Antacids are also added for further recovery support. Common support drugs of antacids are either H2 receptor antagonists, and/or a proton pump inhibitor. Sucralfate was used as an option.  Parenteral nutrition greatly increased chance of recovery. An esophagectomy can be issued if the disorder is severe enough.

Prognosis
The prognosis for acute esophageal necrosis is generally poor, as the condition is associated with a high risk of mortality (up to 32%). Most mortality is attributed to the underlying cause; mortality specifically caused by AEN is about 6 percent.

Society and culture
Acute esophageal necrosis made an appearance on an American medical drama show, Dr. G: Medical Examiner. Jan Garavaglia, the show's host, receives a female body, that at time of the autopsy had a severe case of acute esophageal necrosis due to alcohol use disorder.

History
Acute esophageal necrosis was first described by Goldenberg et al. in 1990. Cases have emerged since 1960, but have never been described as the common names for AEN. Due to its rarity, only 88 cases have been pronounced AEN, but most likely there are many more. Gurvits et al. describes AEN as "poorly described in medical literature". Abdullah et al. published the first-ever systemic review on acute esophageal necrosis and reviewed around 154 patients reported in the literature at the time of publishing.

References

External links 

Esophagus disorders